Friedrich Heinrich Helmut Lieth was a German ecologist, botanist and phytogeographer.

Biography
Lieth received his doctorate in Biology from the University of Cologne in 1953 and became a private lecturer at the University of Stuttgart-Hohenheim in 1960. He was then visiting professor in Venezuela and Colombia, professor of botany at the University of Hawaii and at the University of North Carolina at Chapel Hill. From 1977 to 1992 he was a professor at the University of Osnabrück where he held the chair for ecology.

Helmut Lieth married Magdalena Roth in 1952. The couple had a daughter and three sons.

Research
Lieth became widely known through the climate diagram world atlas published together with Heinrich Walter between 1960 and 1967. The descriptive form of climate display (the Walter-Lieth climate diagram ) conceived here received the highest international recognition.

Selected works
  with around 8,000 climate stations (around 9,000 diagrams), 33 main maps, 22 secondary maps; published in 3 issues
  [ e-book published: 9 March 2013] 
 
  republished 2011, 2012

References

German ecologists
Academic staff of Osnabrück University
University of Hawaiʻi at Mānoa faculty
Botanists active in Europe
Botanists active in North America
1925 births
2015 deaths
20th-century German botanists